The Ulyanovsk Oblast in Russia contains about 118 protected natural areas.

National Parks

 Sengiley mountains

Natural Monuments

 Wood Pearl
 Relic woods
 Akshuatian dendopark
 Greater springs
 The Mountain pine forest
 The Source of Sviyaga River
 The Forest belt of Genko
 Cretaceous steppes from karagana
 Upper Jurassic deposits of Gorodishchi
 Borok Island

References
 https://web.archive.org/web/20111224073959/http://eco.ulstu.ru/
 

Geography of Ulyanovsk Oblast
U01
Ulyanovsk Oblast
Tourist attractions in Ulyanovsk Oblast